Sphaceloma theae is a plant pathogen infecting tea.

References

External links
 USDA ARS Fungal Database

Fungal plant pathogens and diseases
Tea diseases
Myriangiales
Fungi described in 1939